Frinco is a comune (municipality) in the Province of Asti in the Italian region of Piedmont, located about 40 kilometres (25 mi) east of Turin and about 11 kilometres (7 mi) north of Asti. As of 31 December 2004, it had a population of 752 and an area of 7.3 km2.

The municipality of Frinco contains the frazioni (subdivisions, mainly villages and hamlets) Molinasso, S. Defendente, Bricco Morra and Bricco Rampone.

Frinco borders the following municipalities: Castell'Alfero, Corsione, Tonco, and Villa San Secondo.

Demographic evolution

References

Cities and towns in Piedmont